To send (an enemy) under the yoke was a practice in ancient Italy whereby defeated enemies were made to pass beneath a yoke constructed of spears either to humiliate them or to remove blood guilt.

History
The custom was a ritual humiliation of enemies practiced by the people of ancient Italy. Both the Romans and the Samnites forced the captives of their defeated enemies to pass under a yoke formed from spears. The practice is said to have originated as a form of expiation. According to Livy, Horatius killed his own sister because she mourned the death of her lover Curiatius rather than her fallen brothers. In order to spare Horatius capital punishment and to allow him to remain within society, he was made to pass underneath a beam meant to remove his murder guilt. 

The early twentieth century historian W. Warde Fowler identified this as a means of removing "taboo" (sacer) and therefore in order to release their enemies they were stripped and passed under the yoke. Perhaps the most recognizable case of passing under the yoke followed the defeat of the Romans by the Samnites in 321 BCE at the Caudine Forks. Eventually the practice of passing under the yoke was no longer about ritual removal of "guilt", and instead was a means of humiliating defeated enemies.

References

Ancient Roman culture